Bilibili (stylized bilibili), nicknamed B Site, is a video sharing website based in Shanghai where users can submit, view and add overlaid commentary on videos. Since the mid-2010s, Bilibili began to expand to a broader audience from its original niche market that focused on animation, comics, and games (ACG), and it has become one of the major Chinese over-the-top streaming platforms serving videos on demand such as documentaries, variety shows, and other original programming.

Bilibili hosts videos on various themes, including anime, music, dance, science and technology, movies, drama, fashion and video games, but it is also known for its extensive kuso-style parodies by subcultural content creators. Bilibili provides a live streaming service where the audience can interact with streamers. Bilibili also offers games, mostly ACG-themed mobile games, such as the Chinese version of Fate/Grand Order.

Bilibili is also known for its scrolling danmu ("bullet curtain," 弹幕) commenting system.

History 
Inspired by similar video sharing websites, Nico Nico Douga and AcFun, Xu Yi (known as "⑨bishi" on the internet) founded Bilibili in 2009. At the time, Xu Yi was an AcFun user and wanted to create a better website than AcFun. He spent three days creating a prototype website named Mikufans.cn as a fandom community of Hatsune Miku. As it grew, he reshaped the website to specialise in video sharing and launched it on 14 January 2010 with the name Bilibili, which is the nickname of the protagonist Mikoto Misaka in the anime A Certain Scientific Railgun. Bilibili also names many of its features after the anime. Bilibili celebrates Mikoto Misaka's birthday on its homepage every year on 2 May.

In 2011, Bilibili's domain name bilibili.us was revoked because of the domain registrar enforcing .us restrictions. As a result, Bilibili switched to bilibili.tv on 25 June 2011. Later that year, Xu Yi founded the startup, Hangzhou Huandian Technology based in Hangzhou, Zhejiang, to develop and operate Bilibili.

In April 2012, Bilibili obtained an agreement with Nico Nico Douga to webcast the latest Chinese-subbed episodes of the newly airing anime Fate/Zero starting from 7 April. However, the program was censored after three episodes for being reported as unauthorised operations of Internet audio-video broadcasting services. Hangzhou Huandian Technology was administratively penalised and fined ¥10,000 by the local government.

In August 2012, Bilibili started to display logos on its homepage to indicate its affiliation with the state-owned Shanghai Media Group and share the use of various content provider licenses in the hopes of avoiding future legal risks. Meanwhile, anonymous visitors to its website were redirected to a subdomain of Shanghai Media Group Broad Band subsidiary (bilibili.smgbb.cn).

Chen has a degree from Chengdu University of Information Technology, was a general manager at Kingsoft, and founded internet companies like Cheetah Mobile and Beike Internet Security. Fortune named Chen Rui as one of China's 40 Under 40 in 2016. Chen was an early member of Bilibili's community and started watching anime on the platform in 2010, before he met Xu Yi in 2021 when he was convinced to become the company's earliest investor. He was the fifth member of the company.

In October 2016, Bilibili announced that it will become the sponsor of the Shanghai Sharks basketball team. Bilibili chose to sponsor the Shanghai Sharks as both entities originate from Shanghai. The team later changed its name to Shanghai Bilibili.

In December 2017, Bilibili purchased an e-sports team originally called IM for League of Legends and renamed it to Bilibili Gaming (BLG).

In January 2018, Bilibili purchased the broadcasting rights to the spring competition season of LPL, League of Legends World Championship, and League of Legends Rift Rivals. In September of the same year, Bilibili purchased Hangzhou Spark, an Overwatch League team. The team took part in the 2019 Overwatch League season.

In March 2018, Bilibili filed for an initial public offering of up to US$0.4 billion on the New York Stock Exchange (NYSE). The company listed on the NASDAQ on 28 March 2018.

On 23 March 2019, Bilibili announced at AnimeJapan that they had partnered with Sony-owned American anime distributor Funimation to jointly license anime titles for both the U.S. and Chinese markets.

Upon completion of the deal, Sony and Bilibili signed an agreement for the expansion of anime and mobile games within the Chinese market. Later that year, Bilibili Esports, its e-sports arm, signed a partnership deal with Ping An Bank.

Bilibili began its foray into original programming by joining the production of a fourth season for Informal Talks. In August 2020, Bilibili produced the show . In December 2020, it produced a competition programme for voice actors called Voice Monster. In December 2021, Bilibili had announced that subsequent seasons for Voice Monsters, Informal Talks, and Rap of Youth would be released in 2022. New programmes such as Crazy Artist would also be produced.

In September 2020, the company launched Bilibili Video Satellite.

On 3 February 2021, Bilibili announced it had acquired Shanghai Yarun Culture Communications Co., Ltd, the parent company of animation studio Haoliners Animation League and its subsidiaries. On 23 March 2021, it was reported that Bilibili would raise US$2.6 billion on the Hong Kong stock exchange (HKEX). This would be the company's secondary listing, as it is already public on the NASDAQ in New York City. On 29 March 2021, Bilibili was listed on the Hong Kong Stock Exchange at an opening price of HK$790.

Features 
Besides hosting video content, Bilibili's main feature is a real-time captioning system that displays user comments as streams of scrolling subtitles overlaid on the screen, visually resembling a danmaku shooter game. These are called bullet comments, danmu, or danmaku. Such subtitles are broadcast to all viewers in real-time, creating a chat room experience in which users feel like watching and playing together with others. This system offers various subtitle controls, including style, format, and movement. Users can also create translated and soramimi subtitles, or special effects with carefully formed subtitles.

Bilibili's platform also offers a feature called "advanced subtitles", where users can use an ECMAScript-based API to control video playback, dynamically change danmaku subtitles and draw shapes on the screen. However, some features are only available on browsers running Adobe Flash, and do not work well with HTML5 players. This functionality is only available with the video poster's permission.

Danmaku are easy to post, but only registered users who have passed a verification check and have a phone number tied to their account are allowed to post them. Comments usually move from right to left on a video, and if viewers do not wish to be distracted, they can disable them. There are three types of bullet comments offered on Bilibili: rolling comments, top comments and bottom comments. Non-registered users can make comments, but each comment is limited to 20 characters. Registered users may edit the size and colour of their comments, and have an increased character limit of 220. The video creator has the ability to save or delete comments. Bilibili users may use acronyms or slang unique to the site, such as the code "2333" to indicate laughter. Another type of comment unique to Bilibili is a "high energy alert" (高能预警), which is a kind of spoiler warning, to tell the audience that something exciting or climactic is approaching. Research result states that when the main purpose of watching videos is entertaining, the bullet comments meets the leisure and self-expression needs of users.

The Ministry of Culture of China has criticised the bullet comment system for allowing the spread of hateful messages on videos.

Bilibili is experimenting with HTML5 video playback technology and has released smartphone apps for video playback on iOS, Android and Windows Phone. It also has an API service, enabling third-party developers to access website content including video lists, comments, subtitles, topics and programmes, obtain the services for publishing manuscripts in bulk. The service is rate-limited and requires developer keys for authentication.

User characteristics

Users 
In 2015, it was estimated that Bilibili served over 50 million users. In 2018, the number of Bilibili's monthly active users in the first quarter reached 77.5 million, a year-on-year increase of 35%. Among these users, the average number of monthly paying users in the quarter was approximately 2.5 million, a year-on-year increase of 190%. This growth continued to 127.9 million in September 2019. As of Q4 of 2020, Bilibili had 202 million average monthly active users.

As of Q3 2022, Bilibili’s average monthly active users reached 332.6 million, a 25% increase from the same period in 2021. The average daily active users reached 90.3 million, a 25% increase from the same period in 2021. The average monthly paying users reached 28.5 million, a 19% increase from the same period in 2021.

Demographics 
As of 2019, 87% of visitors came from mobile sites.  According to data from SimilarWeb, 88.33% of the users were from China, followed by 2.7% from Taiwan and 2.05% from the United States. Among them, 73.05% of users were men, and 26.95% were women.

The primary users of Bilibili are "Generation Z," that is, the generation born between 1990 and 2009. In 2016, less than 10% of Bilibili's user base was over 25 years old. As of September 2019, 78% of Bilibili's users were aged between 18 to 35. According to statistics from QuestMobile, as of the end of 2021, nearly 82% of Bilibili's users were Gen-Z users, and more than half of them were mainly from the most well-developed cities in China, such as Beijing, Shanghai, and Guangzhou.

Professional Users 
Regarding content composition, the videos on Bilibili are mainly composed of Professional User Generated Videos (PUGV). And the person who creates and uploads the video is called Up Zhu (Up主).

According to the financial report of Bilibili for the third quarter of 2019, PUGV content accounted for 90% of the overall video-playing volume of Bilibili. In the third quarter, the average monthly active Up Zhu of Bilibili reached 1.1 million. The average monthly submission volume reached 3.1 million, a year-on-year increase of 93% and 83%, respectively.

Operations 
Bilibili consists of nine team members all versed in Japanese language and culture. Two are web developers, including Xu Yi himself, and the others are website editors and moderators. Bilibili is free to use, with its main revenue coming from webpage advertisement and affiliate marketing.

Membership 
Most content on Bilibili is free for anonymous viewing, while some videos require a membership. Select videos are also only available under the Chengbao system (承包), in which case members must pay to access them. Membership is also required to submit videos or comments. Bilibili limits its memberships to balance the quality of its users and moderation capacity. In March 2013,a limited number of invitation codes was shared with existing users. Registrants using the codes needed to complete 100 questions to become a premium member, with questions mostly related to ACG. On 19 May 2015, Bilibili reduced the number of questions to 50, with 20 questions on internet comment etiquette. On 26 February 2017, Bilibili reinstated the 100-question test, with a passing threshold of 60. Existing users can purchase invitation codes.

Subscription
On 9 October 2016, Bilibili launched a premium membership subscription service on the site, costing around ¥25 per month, or approximately US$2 per month on a long-term subscription. Premium members get access to videos in high resolution and can receive early access to certain videos, alongside other benefits such as discounts on Bilibili-owned games. From 1 January 2018, Bilibili extended its early access programme to premium members, giving them early access to certain episodes of animated series, with regular members needing to wait a week to watch them.

Account suspension
On 26 February 2017, an account blocking function was launched to regulate the website's content and users. Offensive comment can be deleted by administrators and offenders would be penalised. Accounts could be suspended temporarily or permanently, depending on the severity of the offence. On 15 June 2017, Bilibili launched a "discipline committee", allowing members to arbitrate reports of violations in some communities and decide whether the behaviour is illegal, and vote on the penalty.

Upload and review
Bilibili does not allow duplicate videos, but does allow high-resolution and lower-resolution versions of the same content. Similar to other Chinese video sharing websites, Bilibili is subject to strict censorship. As of 10 February 2017, individual users are prohibited from uploading videos regarding politics, with only certified bodies allowed to upload political content.

Community 
Bilibili's official mascots are elected by its community, Bili-tans, named "22" and "33".

Bilibili has also established affiliated communities: Corari (currently offline), a collaboration project founding community; DrawYoo, a creative drawing community; The Ninth Channel, a support forum for Bilibili.

Collaborations

Taobao 
Bilibili collaborated with Taobao in December 2014 as part of the 12 December Online Shopping Festival. Bilibili's logo appeared on Taobao's front page. Users could shoot danmaku to express their ideas.

Durex 
On 13 March 2015, Durex released an advertisement on Bilibili's website, which lasted for three hours. The advertisement was aimed at buyers purchasing presents for White Day. The advertisement campaign aimed to promote Durex Air, and attracted 100 million viewers.

Xiaomi 
On 10 May 2015, Xiaomi held a product launch for the Xiaomi Max smartphone on Bilibili over 19 days. The campaign reached 39.54 million viewers during the period and over 3.17 billion comments were made.

Games 
The group's companies have published the following games in the Chinese market:

 Bilibili
BanG Dream! Girls Band Party!

 MICA Team / Sunborn Network Technology
Girls' Frontline

 (Wuhu) Sharejoy Network Technology Co.Ltd
Fate/Grand Order
Azur Lane
Bible Bullet

Fantasy Hunter Story

 Bilibili HK Limited
100 Sleeping Princes and the Kingdom of Dreams

 Shanghai Hode Information Technology
Ark Order

Controversies

Cai Xukun 
Cai Xukun, a Chinese artist and singer, was chosen as a spokesperson of the NBA in January 2019, sparking controversy. His introduction video from Idol Producer, which involved him playing basketball, went viral. Following this, hundreds of parody videos appeared on Bilibili mocking the original video. Cai issued a lawsuit notice asking for Bilibili to remove the parody videos. Bilibili responded that they believed the videos were not illegal, and refused to penalise the users who uploaded the videos. Lyrics from the video, such as "sing, dance, rap, basketball" went on to become viral as well. To prevent potential backlash and spam from users, Bilibili temporary halted the verification of new accounts.

Servers in Taiwan 
In September 2019, Bilibili was found to be renting servers illegally in Taiwan. The National Communications Commission required provider Chief Telecom to cease the tie-up immediately after the issue was discovered by a Taiwan-based think tank. Video on demand services based in mainland China are forbidden to operate in Taiwan due to national security concerns.

Source code leak 
In April 2019, a repository called "Bilibili website backend codes", with a large number of usernames and passwords, was published on GitHub. The repository was taken down by GitHub due to "excessive use of resources". The repository amassed more than 6,000 stars in just a few hours. However, copies could still be found on GitHub and other platforms. Bilibili responded that the leaked code was from an older version of their website and that they had taken "defensive steps to ensure the accident won't compromise user data security".

996 work schedule 
On 7 February 2022, an influencer known as Wang Luobei posted on Weibo about the death of a content moderator while at work in Bilibili's Wuhan subsidiary during the Lunar New Year holiday period. The cause of death was suspected to be overwork, sparking controversy amid the prevalence of the 996 work schedule in China's internet industry. Bilibili responded the same day that the employee was feeling unwell since the afternoon of 4 February 2022 and completed a standard nine-hour shift that day, ruling out the possibility of excessive work as the cause of death. The response was refuted by a Weibo user who claimed to be the cousin of the deceased, stating that he did not return home for the festive period and stayed behind in Wuhan for work.

References

External links 
 
 

 
Video hosting
Chinese social networking websites
Companies listed on the Nasdaq
Internet properties established in 2010
2018 initial public offerings
Hangzhou Spark
Live streaming services
Video game streaming services
Chinese brands
Chinese entertainment websites
Companies listed on the Hong Kong Stock Exchange